The Stowaway is a 1958 French-Australian film directed by Australian director Lee Robinson and French Lebanese director Ralph Habib. It was shot on location in Tahiti.

There are French and English versions of the film. The French version is known as Le Passager clandestin.

Synopsis
A group of adventurers compete with one another to find the missing heir Rene Marechal, thought to be near Tahiti. Major Owens, a middle aged Englishman with a shady past, discovers the island on which Marechal lives but is murdered by the criminal Mougins.

Mougins sets out for the island with Colette, a night club singer who is Marechal's former mistress. She is rescued by Jean, who had earlier helped Colette stow away on the boat to Tahiti. Jean and Mougins fight and Mougins falls overboard and is eaten by a shark. Jean and Collette decide to give up the search for Marechal and live on the islands.

Cast
 Martine Carol as Colette
 Roger Livesey as Major Owens
 Arletty as Gabrielle
 Serge Reggiani as Mougins
 Karlheinz Böhm as Jean
 Reg Lye as Buddington
 James Condon as the purser
 Charley Mauu as Taro
 Yvon Chabana as Max
 Vahinerii Tauhiro as Vahinerii
 Doris Fitton

Production
In May 1955 it was announced producer Paul Decharne, best known for Manon and Bluebeard, would make two films a year in the Pacific. The first two would be co productions with Rafferty and Robinson:, starting withWalk into Paradise, which would be shot on location in New Guinea, in English and French versions.

The second film would be made in Tahiti with French director Yves Allegret as the principal director and Robinson as director of the English version. This movie would be shot in Cinema-Scope and would hopefully star Gerard Philippe.

"I was told that the Pacific was very wide, and its capital was Sydney* so I came here," said Decharne."I also heard that Australians appreciated French films better than any other country outside Europe. 'La Ronde' made more money in Australia than it did in France."

At one stage the film was called Vahini Tahiti.

The film was shot towards the end of 1957 in Tahiti and the Society Islands.

Lee Rafferty and Chips Robinson contributed money towards the production via sales from Walk into Paradise and funds loaned from Herb McIntyre from the superannuation fund of Universal Picture's Australian branch.

Dialogue scenes were filmed twice, in English (by Robinson) and French (by Habib). Robinson claimed he didn't like Habib's style of direction.

He was a mad home movies crank and would stand by the camera or even ten feet away from it and be shooting the scene that was his first take. I used to wonder how the hell does he know what is going on there. Often he was on an entirely different angle to the camera. He often seemed more concerned about getting a good scene on his little 16 mm camera. Right from the beginning I found I was in a marvellous position as the second follow-up director because I could see everything that was being done and then rack my brains for some little thing that might spice the scene up a bit.

Noted Sydney theatre actor Doris Fitton had a supporting role.

Release
The film was released in France but only received a limited release in Australia. It was not as successful as Walk into Paradise.

References

External links
 
 
 The Stowaway at National Film and Sound Archive
 The Stowaway at Oz Movies

1958 films
English-language French films
1958 adventure films
Films based on Belgian novels
Films based on works by Georges Simenon
Films directed by Lee Robinson
Films directed by Ralph Habib
Films set in French Polynesia
1950s French-language films
French multilingual films
Australian multilingual films
French-Australian culture
1950s multilingual films